Powrachute, LLC is an American aircraft manufacturer, based in Hastings, Michigan. The company specializes in the design and production of powered parachutes.

The company was formed in January 1999 in Columbus, Kansas by Bill Amyx. He retired in 2005 and sold the company to Jeff and Deb Williams who relocated it to Middleville, Michigan, then later moved the operation to Hastings, Michigan.

The company also builds the Evolution Revo ultralight trike under contract.

Aircraft

References

External links

Aircraft manufacturers of the United States
Powered parachutes
Companies based in Michigan